Kheyrabad Khalifeh (also Romanized as Kheyrābād Khalīfeh; also known as Deh-e Kahlīfeh, Deh-e Khahlīfeh, Deh Kahlīfeh, and Vaḩdatābād) is a village in Lishtar Rural District, in the Central District of Gachsaran County, Kohgiluyeh and Boyer-Ahmad Province, Iran. At the 2006 census, its population was 473, in 100 families.

References 

Populated places in Gachsaran County